HMS Kent is a Type 23 Duke class frigate of the Royal Navy, and the twelfth ship to bear the name, although formally she is named after the dukedom rather than the county. Sponsored by Princess Alexandra, The Hon. Lady Ogilvy (daughter of the late Prince George, Duke of Kent), Kent was launched on 28 May 1998 and commissioned on 8 June 2000. She was the first ship to enter Royal Navy service in the 21st century.

Kents lineage boasts sixteen Battle Honours from the three given to the first Kent of 46 guns built in 1653, to the five awarded to the ninth and tenth Kents of World War I and World War II.

Service history

2001–2010

March 2002 saw Kent return from the Persian Gulf after a five-month mission. Kent seized more than £4 million of oil and illegal cargo: a record for the time. This mission also included the boarding of MV Ismael, a vessel which strayed in and out of Iranian waters to avoid capture – waters which Kent was forbidden to enter.

On 12 June 2006 Kent started a six-month deployment to Gibraltar, Malta and the Suez canal.

Kent was in the Northern Persian Gulf working 22-day patrols safeguarding the oil platforms and checking shipping in the area as per United Nations Security Council Regulations. Kent later conducted a self-maintenance period at Port Rashid, Dubai. After 60 days of patrols, 47 security sweeps of vessels approaching the oil platforms and 515 queries of merchant vessels, Kent left the Northern Persian Gulf and set sail home. A four-day visit to Muscat in Oman followed, which included training with the Omani Navy.

In Mumbai, Prince Andrew visited Kent.

Later on her way home, Kent made a goodwill visit to Beirut on Friday 17 November. The ship featured on national news and the crew visited some of the local sites.

After Beirut, Kent visited Souda Bay and then the port of Civitavecchia, Italy. Algiers was the next stop, showcasing training to the Algerian Navy.

In February 2007  the ship was awarded the Thales fleet active ASW award 2005/2006. Due to the busy period of deployments, the award ceremony had to be delayed until 2007.

December 2007 saw Kent preparing for the customary Operational Sea Training period, training with aircraft and sea boat operations.

January 2008 saw preparations for OST continuing afoot ready for the initial materials and safety audit.

Kent was in refit for replacement of two of the four Paxman Valenta diesel engines.

May 2008 saw Kent off the Channel Islands providing a demonstration of the Royal Navy to the local islanders. This was also the first Jersey Boat Show with Kent the largest vessel on show. The following Thursday saw the culmination of Operational Sea Training.

Kent would get underway from 'The Wall' at Portsmouth for a six-month deployment to South Asia and the Far East. This voyage included visits to countries such as Russia, China, Japan and Indonesia, as well as participation in various multi-national exercises.

Kent left the Indonesian port of Surabaya (just as Exeter had on the evening of 28 February 1942, on her last fateful voyage), performed the ceremony and then continued on to Jakarta. Aboard were a BBC film crew and four of HMS Exeters veteran survivors (photo below), one of the divers involved in the discovery of the wreck, (who, representing the other three discovery team members, and as part of the memorial service, handed over to the four survivors the Royal Navy Ensign they had 'flown' on the wreck during their discovery dives in February 2007), along with several British dignitaries and high ranking naval officers.

In June 2010, Kent was sent on a mission to Sweden. The celebration of the official Queen's Birthday Party was held on board the British warship in Gothenburg harbour, the first time that the event has been held outside Stockholm. After a stop at Hanö island where tribute was paid to the fifteen British sailors who rest there, Kent then continued to Stockholm to join the celebrations for the Wedding of Victoria, Crown Princess of Sweden, and Daniel Westling.

In December 2010, Kent was withdrawn from the deployable fleet and entered overhaul. Her Commander, Nick Cooke-Priest moved to command Iron Duke, leaving second-in-command, Lieutenant Commander Alasdair Peppe in charge.

2011 to present

In July 2013, Kent was deployed to the Horn of Africa on anti-priracy and anti-drug missions. She worked with the Combined Maritime Forces and returned home in October 2013

In October 2014, Kent deployed to the Persian Gulf alongside  and other US Navy fleet units in the US Fifth Fleet's area of responsibility to help in efforts against smugglers, pirates, terrorists and also in the fight against the Islamic State of Iraq and the Levant. The ship visited many countries in the middle east, including Bahrain and Jordan. HMS Kent returned in May 2015.

In late 2016, Kent entered the Frigate Refit Complex in Devonport for an extensive refit which will include the fitting of the SeaCeptor missile system in place of Sea Wolf. After the refit, she was recommissioned in Portsmouth on 5 October 2018.

On 12 August 2019, Kent deployed toward the Persian Gulf to relieve  and protect commercial shipping in the Persian Gulf region. In 2021, Kent deployed to the Pacific as part of the Royal Navy's carrier strike group.

On 14 October 2021, Kent visited Chattogram, Bangladesh as part of celebrations of 50 years of Bangladeshi independence. She departed Bangladesh on the 19 October.

Changing Rooms
On 2 September 2000, men and women on board HMS Kent participated in a Changing Rooms special to give the ship's mess rooms a makeover.

Affiliations
Kent and Sharpshooters Yeomanry
No. 6 Squadron RAF
The Cinque Ports
The Royal Tank Regiment

References

External links

 

Frigates of the United Kingdom
Military history of Kent
Ships built on the River Clyde
1998 ships
Type 23 frigates of the Royal Navy